In legislative procedure, a rider is an additional provision added to a bill or other measure under the consideration by a legislature, which may or may not have much, if any, connection with the subject matter of the bill. 

Some scholars identify riders as a specific form of logrolling, or as implicit logrolling. Others distinguish riders from logrolling. Adding riders to legislation is not permitted in legislatures bound by a single-subject rule.

United States

Federal legislation 
In the U.S. Congress, riders have been a traditional method for members of Congress to advance controversial measures without building coalitions specifically in support of them, allowing the measure to move through the legislative process: "By combining measures, the legislative leadership can force members to accept a measure that might not survive alone because they want the entire bill to pass." Since the 1980s, however, omnibus bills have become more common: these bills contain provisions, sometime important provisions, on an array of policy areas, and "are powerful for focusing attention away from controversial items to other main items" that either have broad support or are viewed as necessary, "must-pass" measures (such as appropriation bills). While members of Congress often use riders to attempt to kill a piece of legislation, "omnibus bills are pursued in order to get something passed."  The phrase "and for other purposes" is frequently included within bills, even if a rider is not initially attached, so as to permit riders unrelated to the original legislation to be added later.

When the veto is an all-or-nothing power as it is in the United States Constitution, the executive must either accept the riders or reject the entire bill. The practical consequence of the custom of using riders is to constrain the veto power of the executive.

The Line Item Veto Act of 1996 was passed to allow the President of the United States to veto single objectionable items within bills passed by Congress, but the Supreme Court struck down the act as unconstitutional in Clinton v. City of New York.

Riders may be unrelated to the subject matter of bills to which they are attached and are commonly used to introduce unpopular provisions. For example, a rider to stop net neutrality was attached to a bill relating to military and veteran construction projects. Another rider has been the Hyde Amendment which since 1976 has been attached to Appropriation Bills to prevent Medicaid paying for most abortions. Another was the Boland Amendment in 1982 and 1983 to restrict financing of the Contras in Nicaragua.

A recent notable example of a rider was in the Health Care and Education Reconciliation Act of 2010. An amended version of the Patient Protection and Affordable Care Act in 2010 that was signed into law by Barack Obama only one week before, the amended bill included a rider for the Student Aid and Fiscal Responsibility Act, whose student loan reform was completely unrelated to the broader bill's primary focus on health care reform.

State legislation 
Riders exist at the state level as well.  For just one example, a 2005 bill in West Virginia that was primarily focused on limiting the number of members that cities can appoint to boards of parks and recreation unexpectedly included a rider that made the English language the official language of the state of West Virginia. Most members of the West Virginia Legislature did not realize that the rider had been entered into the bill until it had already passed both state houses. Then-West Virginia governor Joe Manchin, although a personal supporter of the English-only movement, promptly vetoed the bill due to a provision in the Constitution of West Virginia that limits bills to one topic, which also makes riders de facto unconstitutional in West Virginia.  To counteract riders, 43 of the 50 U.S. states have provisions in their state constitutions allowing the use of line item vetoes so that the executive can veto single objectionable items within a bill, without affecting the main purpose or effectiveness of the bill.

Europe

France 
The Constitutional Council of France has taken an increasingly hard view against riders, which it considers unconstitutional and contrary to the rules of procedure of the parliamentary assemblies. In 1985 the Council started striking down amendment to laws because they were unrelated to the subject of the law. Two special categories of riders merit mention: the "budgetary riders", attached to budget bills, and "social riders", attached to the budget bill for social security organizations, clauses that have no link to the budget or to the social security budgets, respectively.

Greece 
Greece's constitutional provisions regarding parliamentary procedure forbid the parliamentary discussion of bills containing unrelated topics. Specifically, article 74, paragraph 5 of the Greek Constitution stipulates that a) a bill that contains provisions unrelated to its main subject is not introduced for discussion, and b) additions or amendments unrelated to the bill's main subject are not introduced for discussion.

Hungary 
In 2005, the Constitutional Court of Hungary struck down the yearly national budget law in its entirety, because almost half of the paragraphs were not related to state fiscals at all, but modified 44 other existing pieces of legislation, which concerned health regulations, public education and foreign relations. This judicial ruling restricted the government's future options in bypassing due parliamentary debate and imposing certain reforms unilaterally.

United Kingdom 
In some legislative systems, such as the British Parliament, riders are prevented by the existence of the long title of a bill that describes the full purpose of the bill. Any part of the bill that falls outside the scope of the long title would not be permitted. However, legislators often bypass this limitation by naming a bill vaguely, such as by appending "and for connected purposes" to the name.

Philippines
The Congress of the Philippines is prohibited to add riders in bills. According to Article VI, Section 26(1) of the Constitution of the Philippines, bills must espouse a particular subject which has to be conveyed in the title thereof.

Examples
 CISA Act (2015)
 REAL ID Act (2005)
 Illicit Drug Anti-Proliferation Act (2003)
 Lautenberg Amendment
 Hyde Amendment
 The rider "Confirmation of antitrust status of graduate medical resident matching programs" was attached to the Pension Funding Equity Act and gave the Association of American Medical Colleges a victory in the antitrust case Jung v. Association of American Medical Colleges.

See also
Christmas tree bill
Cornhusker Kickback
Downsize DC Foundation
Omnibus spending bill
Wrecking amendment

References

Rider
Legislatures